Thermos (also known as Thermon  or Thermum) was an ancient Greek sanctuary, which served as the regular meeting place of the Aetolian League. Its focal point was the temple of Apollo Thermios, famous for the archaic terracotta metopes decorated with painted scenes from mythology, which are among the earliest examples of this art form in Greece.

History
Thermos was already an important regional centre in the prehistoric period: a long apsidal building (with one rounded end: "Megaron A"), elliptical and square houses with finds of pottery in the Middle Helladic tradition together with imports of high quality Mycenaean pottery can all be dated to the Late Helladic IIA period c. 1500 BC. This settlement continued to flourish throughout the Mycenaean period, even after the destruction of the Mycenaean palaces (LH IIIC, 1200–1100 BC) when a fine krater (large bowl) decorated with warriors in the same style as the well-known Warrior Vase found by Heinrich Schliemann at Mycenae was brought to the site.

A large rectangular building (Megaron B) which underlies the Temple of Apollo was long thought to demonstrate the hypothetical development of the Archaic Greek temple form from the Mycenaean palace with the addition of a peristyle (or surrounding colonnade). Recent excavations, however, conducted by Professor I. Papapostolou for the Archaeological Society of Athens (Archaiologike Etairia Athenon) have demonstrated that a) the building is likely to have been constructed after the end of the Mycenaean period c. 1000–900 BC; b) that the curious horseshoe shaped setting of stone slabs which appeared to surround the Megaron was only put in place after the Megaron had gone out of use and c) that the burnt stratum with the typical offerings of the later Geometric period (800–700 BC), attested at many Greek sanctuary sites such as Olympia and Delphi, intervenes between the slabs and the foundations of the Archaic temple which carried the painted metopes. Thus, although the site of the temple was obviously of special importance from at least the end of the Mycenaean period, there is no demonstrable architectural continuity.

Thermos was not a city in the sense of a built-up urban centre like Athens, Argos or Corinth and until a late date the Aetolian League was a loose association with a tribal basis rather than a group of city-states. It is not known whether the sanctuary had a formal boundary before the Hellenistic period when substantial fortification walls with gates and towers were built on three sides of the enclosure. At the same time, three long stoas were built within the precinct and the spring just to the south of the temple (perhaps the original reason for the location of the site) was enclosed to form a fine stone-lined pool.

The Aetolians at this period embellished the sanctuary with astonishing numbers of bronze dedicatory statues but today only a few fragments (fingers and toes or horses' hooves) as well as the marble bases on which they stood, survive to illustrate this wealth. Unfortunate political alliances led to the sack of the site first by the King Philip V of Macedon during the Social War (220–217 BC) and then by the Romans in 189 BC which effectively ended its existence.

Modern village
The ancient name is preserved in the nearby contemporary Greek village of Thermo.

See also
 Thermo, Greece

References

External links
 Perseus Site Catalogue.
 Prehistoric Thermon.
 Polybius Histories Book 28.
 Planetware "Temple of Apollo".
 The League of the Aitolians by John D. Grainger

Populated places in ancient Aetolia
Ancient Greek sanctuaries in Greece
Mycenaean sites in Western Greece
Former populated places in Greece
Aetolian League
Cities in ancient Greece